Wanjiku Muhia is a Kenyan politician and Current Member of Parliament for Kipipiri Constituency; Served as Regional Member of Parliament in the 4th East African Legislative Assembly(EALA) (2018-2022); and the First Nyandarua County Women Representative (2013-2017).

Before joining Politics, she was the Regional Customer Service Manager at Equity Bank Limited (2006-2012) and Human Resource/ Administration Manager at  Florensis BV  (1998-2003).

She is the founder of Wanjiku Muhia Foundation . This Organization also works hand in hand with the Nyandarua Cancer Centre in fighting and educating the public about Cancer.

Education
She attended Kamahia Primary School and later joined Nakuru High School where she sat for her O-Level exams.

 Graduated from the University of Nairobi with Diploma in Human Resources Management; 
 Graduated from Kenya Methodist University with Bachelor in Business Administration. 
 Wanjiku Muhia holds a Master's Degree in Business Administration from University of Sunderland UK. 
 Studied Leaders in Development: Managing Change in a Dynamic World from Harvard Kennedy School, USA.

Politics 
Wanjiku Muhia is the former women's representative for Nyandarua and current member of parliament representing Kipipiri constituency in Nyandarua county. She was elected as an MP for the Jubilee Party in the 2013 Kenyan general election, with 158,486 votes (66.7% of all votes cast).

In December 2017, the Jubilee Party nominated Wanjiku for the East African Legislative Assembly. She secured her place on the ELEA with 180 votes.

On 9 August 2022, she was elected member of the national assembly representing the Kipipiri constituency, beating the incumbent Amos Kimunya of the Jubilee party.

Achievements 
 She amended the Persons Living with Disability (PLWDs) Act of 2013. This amendment compelled all television stations in Kenya to include sign language in their news bulletins and programs of national importance.
 Hon. Wanjiku Muhia petitioned the government to reinstate cargo carriers on PSV (Matatu), this helped in preserving jobs for hundreds of thousands of youths in the country.

References

External links
 Muhia Wanjiku
 Hon Wanjiku Muhia, MP

Year of birth missing (living people)
Living people
Members of the 11th Parliament of Kenya
Kenyan women representatives
Members of the East African Legislative Assembly